Kundal Shahi may refer to:

 Kundal Shahi (village), a village in Azad Kashmir, Pakistan
 Kundal Shahi language, the endangered Dardic language spoken there